Bahan Township is located in the north central part of Yangon. The township comprises 22 wards, and shares borders with Yankin Township and Mayangon Township in the north, Sanchaung Township and Kamayut Township in the west, Tamwe Township in the east, and Dagon Township and Mingala Taungnyunt Township in the south. 

Bahan is one of the most prosperous townships in Yangon. Shwetaunggya (formerly, Golden Valley), Sayarsan Road and Inya Myaing are three of Yangon's most exclusive neighborhoods.

Population 
Bahan Township has 96,732 residents with 51,214 being female residents and 45,518 being male residents as of 2014 March.

Education 
The township has 21 primary schools, three middle schools and three high schools.

Landmarks
The following is a list of landmarks protected by the city in Bahan township.

The National League for Democracy and Air Bagan, an international airline, have their headquarters in Bahan.

References

Townships of Yangon